Jadagrace Michiko Gordy-Nash (born September 1, 1999), known mononymously as Jadagrace, is an American actress, dancer, singer, and rapper. She appeared in the 2009 film, Terminator Salvation. Her song "Express Yourself" was released as a single when she was nine years old. She was signed to a record deal in 2012 after being discovered by Redfoo of LMFAO, and released her first single "Run Dat Back" under the Epic Records music label.

Early life
Jadagrace was born to a Japanese-American mother and African-American father. She got her start as a dancer when she was 5 years old, dancing at the Debbie Allen Dance Academy.

Acting career
Jadagrace had her first acting credit for Three Versus, a 2008 short film where she played the character Bitsy Mott. Her first major role came in 2009 when she landed the role of Star in the movie Terminator Salvation. In 2012, Cookie Jar Entertainment began production on The Jadagrace Show, a series about a 12-year-old girl who gets her own television show after a video she uploaded on the Internet goes viral.

Filmography

Music career
Jadagrace recorded her first song, "Express Yourself", when she was nine years old. She was discovered for her music by Redfoo of LMFAO. She signed a deal with Epic Records and released her first single, "Run Dat Back" in 2012.

In 2015, she signed a record deal with Capitol Motown and released her first single titled "Vibe" in July 2016.

After leaving her record label, Jadagrace, along with friend Tyrel Jackson Williams and boyfriend Coy Stewart formed the music collective "Grouptherapy" (stylized as "grouptherapy."). In November 2019, Jadagrace released her first single as part of grouptherapy. titled "Bounce". On April 1, 2020, the collective released their debut EP entitled this is not the album.

References

External links
 
 

Living people
Epic Records artists
American musicians of Japanese descent
African-American actresses
21st-century African-American women singers
21st-century American singers
21st-century American actresses
American child actresses
African-American child actresses
1999 births
American film actresses
American child singers
African-American female dancers
American female dancers
Dancers from California
Place of birth missing (living people)
21st-century American women singers